Helary Mägisalu (born 19 July 1997) is an Estonian wrestler.

He was born in Pärnu. In 2016 he graduated from Audentes Sports Gymnasium.

He started his wrestling exercising in 2005, coached by Karl Pajumäe. In 2018 he won a silver medal at the European Championships. He is 6-times (2016–2021) Estonian champion. Since 2014 he has been a member of Estonian national wrestling team.

In 2022, he lost his bronze medal match in his event at the Matteo Pellicone Ranking Series 2022 held in Rome, Italy.

References

External links

Living people
1997 births
Estonian male sport wrestlers
European Wrestling Championships medalists
Sportspeople from Pärnu
European Games competitors for Estonia
Wrestlers at the 2019 European Games
21st-century Estonian people